Graah Fjord, also known as Devold Fjord and Langenæs Fjord, is a fjord in King Frederick VI Coast, eastern Greenland.

Administratively it is part of the Sermersooq municipality.

History
There are remains of ancient Inuit settlements of the southern group in Imaarsivik, a coastal island at the entrance of the fjord.

The fjord was named after Arctic explorer Wilhelm August Graah of the Danish Navy, who was the first to map this area of the coast of Greenland during an 1828–31 expedition in search of the legendary Eastern Norse Settlement.

Finnsbu was a Norwegian weather and radio station opened on the shore of the fjord by Finn Devold on behalf of the Arctic Trading Co. Devold had first chosen a site in Timmiarmiut Fjord when he arrived in 1932 on Ship Heimen from Tromsø, but then moved to this site to establish the station. The station was abandoned in 1933.

During WWII, on 9 April 1944, a Boeing B-17 Flying Fortress crashed in the fjord. Attempts by aircraft recovery expert Gary Larkins to locate the airframe have been unsuccessful.

Geography

To the southeast the Graah Fjord opens into the Irminger Sea of the North Atlantic Ocean. A good small harbour, named Graahs Havn, is located west of the island.

The fjord has a branch named Jaette Fjord on its NE shore, opening  from the mouth and extending  to the NNW.

See also
List of fjords of Greenland
Accidents and incidents involving the Boeing B-17 Flying Fortress

Bibliography
Spencer Apollonio, Lands That Hold One Spellbound: A Story of East Greenland, 2008

References

External links
Mineral potential in Greenland - Greenlands minerals authority
Seabirds and seals in Southeast Greenland; Results from a survey in July 2014

Fjords of Greenland